Królów Las  is a village in the administrative district of Gmina Morzeszczyn, within Tczew County, Pomeranian Voivodeship, in northern Poland. It is located within the ethnocultural region of Kociewie in the historic region of Pomerania.

The village has a population of 150.

History
Królów Las was a private church village of the monastery in Pelplin, administratively located in the Tczew County in the Pomeranian Voivodeship of the Polish Crown.

During the German occupation of Poland (World War II), in 1939, several Poles from Królów Las were among the victims of large massacres of Poles carried out by the Germans in the Szpęgawski Forest as part of the Intelligenzaktion.

References

Villages in Tczew County